Lieutenant-General Sir John James Hamilton, 1st Baronet (4 August 1755 – 24 December 1835) was a British officer of the Honourable East India Company, the British Army and during the Napoleonic Wars the Portuguese Army who saw action across the world from India to the West Indies and was honoured for his service by both the British and Portuguese royal families. Of noble Irish descent, related by birth to the first Earl Castle Stewart and by marriage to the Earl of Tyrone, Hamilton's extensive career and brave service was widely recognised during his life and after his death.

Early career
John Hamilton was born in Woodbrook near Strabane, County Tyrone, Ireland to James and Elinor Hamilton in 1755. His mother was the niece of the Earl Castle Stewart and through family connections young Hamilton was able to secure a commission in the army of the Honourable East India Company aged only 16 in 1771. Taking a Bengal cadetship and joining the Bengal Light Infantry in 1772, Hamilton was almost immediately pressed into action, participating the British invasion of Cooch Behar at the invitation its rulers who were facing a simultaneous invasion from the Bhutanese to the north. In 1778 Hamilton was promoted to lieutenant and in 1780 was once again in action during the First Anglo-Maratha War, where his troops participated in the storm and capture of Lahar, Gwalior and Bijaigarh from the Maratha Empire. In 1781 at the war's conclusion, Hamilton was promoted again, to captain.

In 1788, seeking advancement, Hamilton transferred to the regular British Army, being attached to the new 76th Regiment of Foot in Calcutta as captain. With this formation, Hamilton was engaged in 1794 during the Second Mysore War fought against the Tipu Sultan, when his troops captured the city of Bangalore which later became part of British East India. The same year, Hamilton married Emily Sophia Monck, the daughter of George Paul Monck and Lady Aramita Beresford, daughter of Marcus Beresford, Earl of Tyrone. Hamilton was promoted to brevet major in the aftermath of this operation and in 1795 was sent as a lieutenant colonel with the 81st Regiment of Foot to the West Indies during the British attempt to capture San Domingo. The effort failed due to the ongoing Haitian Revolution, but Hamilton again distinguished himself during the campaign.

Napoleonic Wars
In 1798 Hamilton was sent to the Cape Colony in South Africa which had only recently been captured from the Dutch. There he and his regiment formed part of the garrison until the Peace of Amiens when he returned to Britain, briefly returning to the Cape at the fresh outbreak of the Napoleonic Wars in 1803 before being made a brigadier-general and appointed to the staff in Ireland. Tiring of working in Ireland, Hamilton volunteered in 1809 to be attached to the Portuguese Army, a formation shattered by the French invasion of 1808. In 1809 as he trained and organised a division of Portuguese infantry, Hamilton was promoted to major-general and in his new rank was made Inspector-General of Portuguese Infantry.

Hamilton was an efficient officer and with his division, attached himself to Sir Arthur Wellesley's British army on campaign in 1810. In 1811 the Portuguese formation underwent its first major action at the Battle of Albuera, Hamilton's division acting as a ready reserve and being called into the height of the battle to reinforce the Allied centre. Hamilton's forces had in fact been drawn into the fight on the left of the Allied line and took some time to be extracted. In the aftermath of the battle, Hamilton's troops were the steadiest and freshest available and immediately returned to the ultimately unsuccessful Second Siege of Badajoz. It has been said of Hamilton that he "evinced the utmost steadiness and courage" at Albuera.

Hamilton commanded the division until 1813, his troops seeing further action defending the town of Alba de Tormes against an army under Marshal Soult in November 1812. In 1813 after four years continuous campaigning, Hamilton was forced to return to England on sick leave and during his absence he was made a Knight Grand Cross of the Order of the Tower and Sword by the Portuguese monarchy and was knighted by the Prince Regent as well as being made honorary colonel of the 2nd Ceylon Regiment. Hamilton returned to his division in late 1813 and commanded them during the last of the fighting in the Peninsula War, seeing action at the Battle of Nivelle. Following the Peace of Fontainebleau, Hamilton returned to the British Army, was made lieutenant general in recognition of his service and placed in the quiet command of Duncannon Fort.

In December 1814, Hamilton was further rewarded with a baronetcy and retirement to his family estates. In 1823 he was made the Colonel-in-chief of 69th Regiment of Foot. He died in 1835 at Tunbridge Wells and was buried in Kensal Green Cemetery in London, survived by his wife, five daughters and son Sir John James Hamilton, 2nd Baronet.

Notes

References
 

1755 births
1835 deaths
People from Strabane
76th Regiment of Foot officers
81st Regiment of Foot officers
Knights Bachelor
Baronets in the Baronetage of the United Kingdom
British Army personnel of the French Revolutionary Wars
British Army personnel of the Napoleonic Wars
British Army personnel of the Peninsular War
Portuguese army personnel
British Army lieutenant generals
Burials at Kensal Green Cemetery
British East India Company Army officers
British military personnel of the Second Anglo-Mysore War
British military personnel of the First Anglo-Maratha War
People of the Peninsular War
Recipients of the Order of the Tower and Sword
Military personnel from County Tyrone